Holly Houston (born 25 September 1989) is an Australian football (soccer) player, who last played for Canberra United in the Australian W-League.

Personal life
Outside of football, Houston has worked as an apprentice signwriter.

References

1989 births
Living people
Australian women's soccer players
Canberra United FC players
Women's association football midfielders
People from Moree, New South Wales
Sportswomen from New South Wales
Soccer players from New South Wales